Harry E. "Hek" Clark was an American college football player and coach. He served as the head football coach at his alma mater, Sewanee: The University of the South in Sewanee, Tennessee, from 1931 to 1939.

Head coaching record

References

Year of birth missing
Year of death missing
American football ends
Sewanee Tigers football coaches
Sewanee Tigers football players